Sampson is a relatively tiny lunar impact crater located near the central part of the Mare Imbrium. It was named after British astronomer Ralph Allan Sampson. To the northeast is the crater Landsteiner and to the southeast lies Timocharis. East of this crater is the Dorsum Grabau, a wrinkle ridge in the mare.

See also 
 Asteroid 9881 Sampson

References

External links

 LTO-40B1 Sampson — L&PI topographic orthophotomap of the crater and its vicinity.

Impact craters on the Moon
Mare Imbrium